Below is a partial list of beaches of the U.S. state of New York.

New York City

 Coney Island Beach and Boardwalk, Brooklyn
 Brighton Beach
 Coney Island
 Fort Tilden, Queens - The pristine beaches in this National Park Service-managed site never get crowds because they are not accessible by public transit and even by car, require a small hike to get to, except for visitors with a fishing license. There are no lifeguards at the park and the tides are strong so swimming is not advised. Besides sunbathing, the primary recreational activities are fishing, bird-watching and beach walks. Visitors can also take a nature walk on trails through a successional maritime forest behind the beach. An observation deck at one of two old military batteries at the park offers sweeping views of New York Harbor.
 Great Kills Park, Staten Island
 Jacob Riis Park, Queens - Jacob Riis Park features an ocean beach with lifeguards in season, a boardwalk, an historic Art Deco bathhouse and recreational facilities that include paddle tennis, baseball, basketball and volleyball courts. It can be reached by public transit and also has parking.  The park is part of Gateway National Recreation Area and is managed by the National Park Service. Concessionaires operate beach clubs that offer food, cabanas and other services and facilities for a fee. Beach wheelchairs are available and the boardwalk is wheelchair-accessible.
 Manhattan Beach, Brooklyn
 Orchard Beach, Bronx
 Plumb Beach, Brooklyn
 Rockaway Beach, Queens
 South Beach and Boardwalk, Staten Island
 Midland Beach, Staten Island
 New Dorp Beach
 South Beach, Staten Island
 Water Taxi Beach, Queens

Remainder of Long Island 

 Atlantic Beach
 East Hampton
 Fire Island
 Long Beach
 Lido Beach
 Montauk
 Ocean Beach
 Point Lookout
 South Hampton
 Westhampton Beach
 West Hampton Dunes

Upstate New York
 Southwick Beach State Park - Lake Ontario
 Sylvan Beach - Oneida Lake

See also 
List of beaches
List of beaches in New England
List of beaches in the United States

References

External links
 NYC Park Beaches - Visitor information from NYC Department of Parks and Recreation
 Fort Tilden, Great Kills Park and Jacob Riis Park - Visitor information from the National Parks of New York Harbor Conservancy
 Gateway National Recreation Area - Visitor information from the National Park Service

Beaches
 
New York City
Beaches